The Speed Maniac is a lost 1919 silent action drama film directed by Edward LeSaint and starring Tom Mix and Eva Novak. It was produced and distributed by Fox Film Corporation.

Cast
Tom Mix - Billy Porter
Eva Novak - Pearl Matthews
Charles K. French - John B. Prescott
Hayward Mack - Philip Malcolm
Lee Shumway - Knockout McCluskey
Helen Wright - Mary
Jack Curtis - Red Morgan
Georgie Stone - Jim McCluskey
George Hackathorne - Tom Matthews
Charles Hill Mailes - John Matthews
Ernest Shields - Cigarette Keefe
Buck Jones - (*as Buck Gebhart)

References

External links

The Speed Maniac at IMDb.com

lobby poster

1919 films
American silent feature films
American black-and-white films
Lost American films
Films directed by Edward LeSaint
Fox Film films
American auto racing films
American action drama films
1910s action drama films
1919 drama films
1910s American films
Silent American drama films